Lourdes Robles is a singer-songwriter and actress, born in San Juan, Puerto Rico. Her career started in the early 1980s as part of duo Lourdes y Carlos, releasing two albums. The duo split and Robles began a solo career, acting in "Barrio Cuatro Calles" and "Generaciones", along Puerto-Rican performer Chayanne. She also performed in some musical productions, including Hello, Dolly!, Into the Woods, and The Fantasticks.

At the Festival del Sol in 1985 held in Miami, Florida, Robles received an award for her song "No Soy Distinta". Sponsored by Danny Rivera, the singer recorded two songs that attracted the attention of the record label Sony Music. In 1989, her single "Corazón en Blanco", a pop song, became her first to chart in the United States, peaking at number 15. The next year, Robles released the album Imágenes, produced by Rudy Pérez and Ricardo Eddy. This album peaked at number 9 in the Billboard Top Latin Albums chart and yielded her first number-one single "Abrázame Fuerte". Her duet with Nicaraguan singer Luis Enrique, "Gracias a Tu Amor", also became a hit, peaking at number two. "Miedo", "Que Lástima" and "Es Él" were released as singles. Robles was awarded with a Gold album for Imágenes.

In 1992 Robles was asked to represent the new generation of performers at the "Fifth Anniversary of the Encounter with the New World", sharing the stage with popular salsa singers, Gilberto Santa Rosa, Andy Montañez, Carmita Jiménez, Danny Rivera, Chucho Avellanet and José Juan Tañón. Hey Jude: Tributo a Los Beatles was released in 1995. This compilation album included 13 songs originally performed by The Beatles. Robles performed a Spanish version of the song "The Long and Winding Road".

Robles parted ways with Sony Music in 1999, signing a recording contract with PolyGram. The first album with this label, Cielo de Acuarela, recorded in New York City, Spain and Santo Domingo, with a blend of tropical and pop music. The following year, a song titled "Lo Odio", produced by Guillermo Torres, was released. In May 2002, Billboard magazine announced that a new album by Robles, under the Latin World Entertainment Group—a Puerto-Rican record label of recent creation, was "under way". Sensaciones was released in 2002.

In 2010, a cover album with songs previously recorded by Juanes, Juan Luis Guerra, Ricardo Montaner, Franco De Vita, La 5ª Estación, Maná and Alejandro Fernández, titled Es Algo Más was unveiled. About this album, Robles said that it would appeal to people "who are fans of her work and people who are not."

Discography

Lourdes Robles (1985)

No Soy Distinta
Te Quiero Como Amigo
Mamá
Gracias
Hasta Ahora
Tú Llegaste
Bailando Samba
Como Todos los Días

Tentación (1988)

Hoy Yo No Quiero Estar Sola
Amor a Tiempo Completo
Dime
Noche Especial
Tentación
Estoy Enamorada
Vas a Quedarte Sólo
Como un Milagro

Noche Tras Noche (1989)

Haz una Hoguera
Yo No Sabía
Nos Quedamos Tú y Yo
Noche Tras Noche
Vida
Corazón en Blanco
Párate al Stop
Es Una Linda Tarde

Imágenes (1990)

Abrázame Fuerte
Es El
Chin Chin (Brindemos Por Nosotros)
Gracias a Tu Amor (Duo con Luis Enrique)
Miedo
Que Lástima
Dime Como Llego a Ti
La Nota Ideal
Ni Tú Ni Yo

Definitivamente (1991)

Sola
A Cara o Cruz
Todo Me Habla de Ti
Pero Me Acuerdo de Ti
Seré Toda Para Ti (I'm Your Baby Tonight)
Definitivamente
Soñando Contigo
Punto de Partida
Confío en Ti
Concierto Para Dos

Amaneciendo en Ti (1993)

Donde Se Ha Ido Tu Amor
Se Te Nota
Amaneciendo en Ti
Baila con la Noche (Dancing in the Sunshine)
Lo Amo
Déjalo Ir Conmigo
Busco el Amor
Déjame Sentirte
Débil el Alma
Si Te Vas

Soy Quien Soy (1996)

Me Déjare Llorar
Bendita Nostalgia
Muchacha
Yo Te Quiero
Ni Tú Ni Nadie
Sin Dirección
Celos
Soy Quien Soy
Es Por Ti
Desconocida

Cielo de Acuarela (1998)

Así Es Mi Isla
Con las Cosas del Querer
Mi Jardín
Bangalí, Bangalá
Candela Pa' los Pies
Si Pudieras Amarme
Ese Hombre Que Tanto Amo Yo
De Que Calor
Siempre
Guajiro Viejo
Pa' los Pesares
Tú

Tuya (2000)

Lo Odio
Tuya
Vete Ya
Alguien Como Tú
Sola
Tu Recuerdo
No Puedo
Mañana
Tómame
Si No Estas

Sensaciones (2003)

Ayúdame
Que Dios Se Apiade de Mí
Lo Daría Todo
Boom, Boom
Y Entonces
Me Trae la Cabeza
Cuesta Arriba
No Sé Que Haria Sin Ti
No Te Podré Olvidar
Muerdo Tu Boda
Que Dios Se Apiade de Mí (Versión Salsa)

Es Algo Más (2010)

Como Aquel Viejo Bolero
Bendita la Luz
Sigo Siendo Reina
Me Dediqué a Perderte
Algo Más
Que Me Des Tú Cariño
Me Late
Para Tu Amor
Yo Puedo Hacer
Entre en Mi Vida
Te Veo Venir Soledad

References

Living people
Actresses from San Juan, Puerto Rico
Latin pop singers
20th-century Puerto Rican women singers
Puerto Rican television actresses
Puerto Rican pop singers
Year of birth missing (living people)
21st-century Puerto Rican women singers
Women in Latin music